Dimitrios Skoumpakis (born 18 December 1998) is a Greek water polo player. He competed in the 2020 Summer Olympics, where he won a silver medal as a member of the Greek team.

Honours
Olympiacos
LEN Champions League runners-up : 2018–19
Greek Championship: 2018–19, 2019–20, 2020–21
Greek Cup: 2018–19, 2019–20, 2020–21
Greek Super Cup: 2018, 2019, 2020

References

1998 births
Living people
Water polo players from Chania
Water polo players at the 2020 Summer Olympics
Olympiacos Water Polo Club players
Greek male water polo players
Olympic water polo players of Greece
Water polo players at the 2015 European Games
European Games bronze medalists for Greece
European Games medalists in water polo
Mediterranean Games medalists in water polo
Mediterranean Games silver medalists for Greece
Competitors at the 2018 Mediterranean Games
Medalists at the 2020 Summer Olympics
Olympic silver medalists for Greece
Olympic medalists in water polo
World Aquatics Championships medalists in water polo